Metastoma is a monotypic genus of land snail in the family Holospiridae.

M. roemeri, the single species of the genus, can be found in arid habitats in the United States (New Mexico and Texas) and Mexico (Coahuila and Chihuahua).

References

 Pfeiffer, L. (1848). Monographia heliceorum viventium. Sistens descriptiones systematicas et criticas omnium huius familiae generum et specierum hodie cognitarum. 2 (1): 1-160 (1848, before September); 2 (2): 161-594 (1848); Lipsiae (Brockhaus).
 Pilsbry, H.A. (1950). Notes on land snails of Texas. The Nautilus, 64(2): 56–58, plate 4. page(s): 56, pl. 4, figs. 1-2
 Sterki, V. (1892). Preliminary list of North American Pupidae (north of Mexico). The Nautilus, 6(1): 2–8. * Cockerell, T.D.A. (1898). Notes on some Pupidae. The Nautilus, 11(12): 136. page(s): 136

Stylommatophora
Gastropods described in 1848